{{DISPLAYTITLE:C28H28P2}}
The molecular formula C28H28P2 (molar mass: 426.47 g/mol, exact mass: 426.1666 u) may refer to:

 1,4-Bis(diphenylphosphino)butane (dppb)
 Chiraphos